Night Has Settled is a 2014 American drama film directed by Steve Clark.

Cast 
 Spencer List as Oliver Nicholas
 Pilar López de Ayala as Luna Nicholas
 Adriana Barraza as Aida
 Eric Nelsen as Valerio
 Tommy Nelson as Nick
 Nicholas Pinto as High School Student
 Raul Pinto Jr. as High School Student
 Ashley Reyes as Daisy
 Adam LeFevre as Kimo

References

External links 

2014 drama films
English films
Indian drama films
2010s English-language films